Tannen's Magic Shop is the oldest operating magic shop in New York City. It was founded by Louis Tannen in 1925.
The shop sponsors Tannen's Magic Camp, a summer camp for young magicians, held since 1974, Tannen's Magic Shop Jubilee convention, where the LOUIE award is given and Tannen's Magic School in New York City.

References

External links
 

Shops in New York City
Magic shops
1925 establishments in New York City